Sumgayit–2 is an Azerbaijani football team from Sumgayit. It plays in the Azerbaijan First Division (second level). It is a reserve team of Azerbaijan Premier League side Sumgayit FK.

History 
The team was founded in 2018 and participates in the Azerbaijan First Division.

Honours
Azerbaijan First Division
 Runner-up (1): 2018–19

Current squad
(captain)''

References

External links 
Official website
 PFL

Reserve team football in Azerbaijan
Sport in Sumgait
Association football clubs established in 2018
Sumgayit FK